Robert Boehm (1914December 26, 2006) was an American political activist. Boehm was a 1935 graduate of Dartmouth College and a 1939 graduate of Columbia University Law School. The son of an attorney, he married his father's secretary, Frances Rozran; Frances Boehm died on February 14, 2006. Boehm committed himself to a lifetime of social activism, including co-establishing, with Maurice Paprin, the Fund for New Priorities in America, as well as serving as the chairman of the board for the Center for Constitutional Rights, founded  in 1966. A supporter of civil rights, an opponent of the Vietnam War, and, late in life, a critic of the US detainee camp at Guantanamo Bay after 2001, Boehm nonetheless distanced himself from leftists he felt were too extreme.

References

External links
New York Times obituary
 Center for Constitutional Rights homepage

1914 births
2006 deaths
American political activists
Dartmouth College alumni
Columbia Law School alumni
American civil rights activists